Tracey Ramsey  (born April 14, 1971) is a former Member of Parliament who represented the riding of Essex in the House of Commons of Canada for one term, from the 2015 Canadian federal election until 2019. In the 42nd Canadian Parliament, Ramsey served as the International Trade Critic, Justice Critic and Deputy Labour Critic. As Vice Chairperson of the International Standing Committee on Trade she was involved heavily in the legislative process for CUSMA, CPTPP and CETA. Ramsey introduced private member bill C-439, titled National Freshwater Strategy Act, which sought to require the Minister of Environment to develop a national strategy for the conservation, protection, and use of freshwater.

Prior to her election, she worked for Ford Motor Company for 19 years. She is a graduate of practical nursing from St. Clair College of Applied Arts and Technology. Tracey is currently the National Women's Director, following two years as union organizer with Unifor the Union, Canada's largest private sector union.

Election results

References

External links

Living people
New Democratic Party MPs
Members of the House of Commons of Canada from Ontario
Trade unionists from Ontario
Women members of the House of Commons of Canada
Ford people
People from Essex County, Ontario
21st-century Canadian politicians
1971 births
21st-century Canadian women politicians
Canadian women trade unionists